Jairton Dupont (born 16 December 1958, in Farroupilha) is a Brazilian chemist whose research concerns ionic liquids, organometallic catalysis, and metallic nanoparticles. Currently, he is a professor at UFRGS. Since 2014 he has been Professor of Sustainable Chemistry at the University of Nottingham.

He is a member of the Brazilian Academy of Sciences and a recipient of Brazil's National Order of Scientific Merit and the TWAS Prize.

Dupont earned his Ph.D. from the Louis Pasteur University, Strasbourg.

Biography

Dupont was born into a family with economic difficulties, he already worked at an early age, and at the age of 14 he was formally hired as a clerk in a hardware store.

References

External links
Jairton Dupont's profile at Google Scholar
Interview with Jairton Dupont and John Spencer

1958 births
Living people
Brazilian chemists
Members of the Brazilian Academy of Sciences
Brazilian people of Swiss descent
University of Strasbourg alumni
Academic staff of the Federal University of Rio Grande do Sul
TWAS laureates